The Millstone Township Schools are a community public school district that serves students in pre-kindergarten through eighth grade from Millstone Township, in Monmouth County, New Jersey, United States.

As of the 2018–19 school year, the district, comprising three schools, had an enrollment of 1,109 students and 93.0 classroom teachers (on an FTE basis), for a student–teacher ratio of 11.9:1.

The district is classified by the New Jersey Department of Education as being in District Factor Group "I", the second-highest of eight groupings. District Factor Groups organize districts statewide to allow comparison by common socioeconomic characteristics of the local districts. From lowest socioeconomic status to highest, the categories are A, B, CD, DE, FG, GH, I and J.

Students in ninth through twelfth grades for public school attend Allentown High School in Allentown, as part of a sending/receiving relationship with the Upper Freehold Regional School District, which also includes students from Allentown and Upper Freehold Township. As of the 2018–19 school year, the high school had an enrollment of 1,206 students and 89.5 classroom teachers (on an FTE basis), for a student–teacher ratio of 13.5:1.

Schools
Schools in the district (with 2018–19 enrollment data from the National Center for Education Statistics) are:
Millstone Township Primary School with 386 students in grades PreK-2
Paul Baker, Principal
Scott Hobson, Assistant Principal
Millstone Township Elementary School with 321 students in grades 3-5
Suzanne Guidry, Principal
Scott Hobson, Assistant Principal
Millstone Township Middle School with 400 students in grades 6-8
Trish Bogusz, Principal
Florencia Norton, Assistant Principal

Administration
Core members of the district's administration are:
Dr. Chris Huss, Superintendent of Schools
Bernard Biesiada, Business Administrator / Board Secretary

Board of education
The district's board of education, with nine members, sets policy and oversees the fiscal and educational operation of the district through its administration. As a Type II school district, the board's trustees are elected directly by voters to serve three-year terms of office on a staggered basis, with three seats up for election each year held (since 2012) as part of the November general election.

References

External links
Millstone Township Schools

School Data for the Millstone Township Schools, National Center for Education Statistics
Upper Freehold Regional School District

Millstone Township, New Jersey
New Jersey District Factor Group I
School districts in Monmouth County, New Jersey